This is a list of awards won by Dame Olivia Newton-John, an English-born Australian pop singer and actress. She had been active since 1963, when she was 15, up until her death in 2022.

Honours 

1979
 Officer of the Order of the British Empire (OBE) in the Civil Division by Queen Elizabeth II in the 1979 New Years Honours List.

1981
 Star on the Hollywood Walk of Fame at 6925 Hollywood Boulevard in the Recording Category on 5 August 1981.

1990
 Goodwill Ambassador to the United Nations Environment Programme 

1998
 Cadillac Concept to the world Humanitarian Award for breast cancer research

1999
 Red Cross – Humanitarian Award for breast cancer and environmental charity work 
 Women's Guild of Cedar-Sinai Hospital – "Woman of the 21st Century" Award for breast cancer and environmental charity work 

2000
 Environmental Media Association – "Ermenegildo Zegna International Environmental Award" for increasing public awareness of environmental problems 
 Rainforest Alliance – Green Globe Arts and Nature Award for her contribution to the preservation of rainforests 

2002
 Australian Recording Industry Association – Hall of Fame

2006
 Australia Day at Penfolds Black Tie Gala – Lifetime Achievement Award  
 Decatur Memorial Hospital (Illinois) – Humanitarian Award for her breast cancer awareness work from the  
 Officer of the Order of Australia (AO) for "service to the entertainment industry as a singer and actor, and to the community through organisations supporting breast cancer treatment, education, training and research, and the environment" 

2007
 American-Australian Association Black Tie Gala – Lifetime Achievement Award 
 Kimmel Center (Philadelphia, PA) – Valor Award for raising funds for cancer research 

2008
 Project Angel Food – Marianne Williamson Founder's Award for her commitment to breast cancer awareness 

2012
 National Trust of Australia (NSW) - named a National Living Treasure of Australia

2015
 Music Victoria Awards of 2015 - Hall of Fame

2018
 Honorary degree of Doctor of Letters (D.Litt) from La Trobe University in Melbourne on 14 May 2018. She also delivered the Commencement Address.

2019
 Companion of the Order of Australia (AC) 
 Dame Commander of the Order of the British Empire (DBE) in the 2020 New Years Honours List.

2021
 Japan's Order of the Rising Sun, Gold Rays with Rosette
 Australian Women in Music Awards  (Honour Roll)

Awards 

Academy of Country Music (ACM) Awards 

Win:
 1973 – Most Promising Female Vocalist

Nomination:
 1974 – Top Female Vocalist

AGVA
 1974 – Rising Star of the Year

American Music Awards 

Wins:
 1974 – Favorite Album – Country: Let Me Be There
 1974 – Favorite Female Artist – Country
 1974 – Favorite Female Artist – Pop/Rock
 1974 – Favorite Single – Pop/Rock: "I Honestly Love You"
 1975 – Favorite Album – Pop/Rock: Have You Never Been Mellow
 1975 – Favorite Female Artist – Country
 1975 – Favorite Female Artist – Pop/Rock
 1976 – Favorite Female Artist – Pop/Rock
 1978 – Favorite Album – Pop/Rock: "Grease"
 1982 – Favorite Female Artist – Pop/Rock

Nominations:
 1975 – Favorite Album – Country: "Have You Never Been Mellow"
 1979 – Favorite Female Artist – Pop/Rock
 1980 – Favorite Female Artist – Pop/Rock

Australian Recording Industry Association (ARIA) Awards 

Win:
 1999 – ARIA Award for Highest Selling Album: Highlights from The Main Event

Nomination:
 1999 – Best Adult Contemporary Album: "Highlights From The Main Event"
 2015 - Best Adult Contemporary Album: "Two Strong Hearts Live"

Billboard Awards
 1974 – Top Pop Singles Artist (Female)
 1975 – Top Pop Albums Artist (Female)
 1976 – Top Adult Contemporary Artist
 1979 – Top Soundtrack: "Grease"
 1982 – Top Pop Single: "Physical"
 1982 – Top Pop Singles Artist
 1982 – Top Pop Singles Artist (Female)
 1997 – Top Pop Catalog Album: "Grease"
 1998 – Top Pop Catalog Album: "Grease"

British Country Music Association Award (BCMA)
 1974 – Female Vocalist of the Year

CableAce Awards 

Nominations:
 1983 - Actress in a Variety Program (Olivia in Concert)
 1989 - Performance in a Music Special (Olivia Down Under)

Cashbox Awards
 1974 – No.1 New Female Vocalist, Singles
 1975 – No.1 Female Vocalist, Singles 
 1975 – No.1 Female Vocalist, Albums

Country Music Association (CMA) Awards 

Win:
 1974 – Female Vocalist of the Year

Nominations: 
 1974 – Album of the Year – If You Love Me Let Me Know
 1974 – Entertainer of the Year
 1974 – Single of the Year – "If You Love Me (Let Me Know)"

Daytime Emmy Awards 

 1999 – Outstanding Original Song – "Love Is A Gift"

Golden Globe Awards

Nominations:
 1978 - Best Performance by an Actress in a Motion Picture Comedy or Musical - "Grease"

Mo Awards
 1998 - Australian Performer of the Year

Grammy Awards

Wins:
 1973 – Best Female Country Vocal Performance: "Let Me Be There"
 1974 – Record of the Year: "I Honestly Love You"
 1974 – Best Female Pop Vocal Performance: "I Honestly Love You"
 1982 – Video of the Year: Olivia Physical

Nominations: 
 1975 – Best Female Pop Vocal Performance: "Have You Never Been Mellow"
 1978 – Album of the Year: Grease
 1978 – Best Female Pop Vocal Performance: "Hopelessly Devoted to You"
 1980 – Best Female Pop Vocal Performance: "Magic"
 1981 – Best Female Pop Vocal Performance: "Physical"
 1982 – Best Female Pop Vocal Performance: "Heart Attack"
 1983 – Best Long Form Music Video: Olivia in Concert
 1984 – Best Short Form Music Video: "Twist of Fate"

Inside Film Awards 
 Best Music Video 'Magic 2011'

King of Pop Awards
 1976 – Best Australian International Performer

National Association of Retail Merchandisers (NARM)
 Best Selling Album by a Female Country Artist: "If You Love Me, Let Me Know"
 Best Selling Album by a Female: "If You Love Me, Let Me Know"

People's Choice Awards
 1975 – Favorite Female Musical Performer  (tied with Barbra Streisand)
 1977 – Favorite Female Musical Performer 
 1979 – Favorite Female Musical Performer 
 1979 – Favorite Motion Picture Actress 

Record World
 1974 – Top Most Promising Country Albums Artist (Female)
 1974 – Top Most Promising Country Singles Artist (Female)
 1974 – Top Pop Female Vocalist (Albums)
 1974 – Top Pop Female Vocalist (Singles)
 1975 – Top Country Female Vocalist (Albums)
 1975 – Top Pop Female Vocalist (Albums)
 1975 – Top Pop Female Vocalist (Singles)
 1976 – Top Country Female Vocalist (Albums)
 1976 – Top Pop Female Vocalist (Albums)
 1978 – Top New Pop Duo (Singles) with John Travolta

References 

Awards
Newton-John, Olivia
Newton-John, Olivia
Newton-John, Olivia
Newton-John, Olivia